Lorenzo Nuvoletta (January 1, 1931 – April 7, 1994) was the head of the Nuvoletta clan, a Neapolitan Camorra organization that operated from the town of Marano di Napoli, situated on the northern outskirts of the city of Naples. Nuvoletta was considered one of the most powerful bosses in the entire Camorra from the 1970s to the early 1990s.

The Nuvoletta clan

Lorenzo Nuvoletta and his brothers Ciro, Gaetano and Angelo were the heirs to a family of landowners. His grandfather and mother had accumulated large areas of land, with its fruit crops exported to other areas. In the 1960s, they joined the clan of Antonio Maisto who was smuggling contraband cigarettes. After their early exploits with the Maisto clan, they diversified and became significant landowners using state funds designed to set up small agricultural landholdings. They made their fortune swindling the Italian government and the European Economic Community (EEC) and intimidating insurance officials, as well as local farmers who took loans from finance companies managed by the Nuvolettas.

Links with the Sicilian Mafia
Apart from being a member of the Camorra, Lorenzo Nuvoletta was also initiated in the Sicilian Mafia. According to Mafia turncoat (pentito) Tommaso Buscetta he was close to Luciano Leggio and Salvatore Riina and his Corleonesi, as well as Michele Greco, to which Mafia family the Nuvoletta clan answered. According to Mafia boss Giuseppe Di Cristina, the Nuvolettas managed a deposit and possibly a heroin refinery on Liggio's behalf. Several Camorra and Mafia clans struck a deal on the division of the shiploads of contraband cigarettes arriving in the port of Naples at a meeting in 1974 in the villa of Lorenzo Nuvoletta in Marano. With Umberto Ammaturo, the clan also engaged in cocaine trafficking.

The Nuvolettas, and in particular Lorenzo as one of the most charismatic members of the entire organisation, were important members of the Nuova Famiglia (NF) a coalition of Camorra clans created in the 1980s to face Raffaele Cutolo's Nuova Camorra Organizzata (NCO). Cutolo wanted to unite the Camorra under his leadership. The support of the Sicilian Mafia was crucial in the war between the NF and the NCO, which ended with the defeat of Cutolo. However, with Cutolo and the NCO out of the picture, the NF alliance soon disintegrated, with a war breaking out between the clan headed by Antonio Bardellino and the Nuvolettas towards the 1984 with the Ciro Nuvoletta's murder and the massacre of Torre Annunziata. To finish this war, they had to sell their ally Valentino Gionta, this affirmation was done by Giancarlo Siani (Neapolitan young journalist) who was murdered for this.

Arrest
In 1984, the Antimafia judge Giovanni Falcone issued an arrest warrant against Nuvoletta for mafia association.

On December 7, 1990, he was arrested, during a summit of the clan at his villa bunker just outside Marano, together with his brother Ciro and other members of the clan as well as the local Christian Democrat politician. He had been a fugitive for ten years. In January 1992, he was sentenced to nine years for Mafia association.

Because of a serious illness he was granted house arrest. He died on April 7, 1994, from liver cancer.

References

Behan, Tom (1996). The Camorra, London: Routledge, 

1931 births
1994 deaths
Deaths from liver cancer
People from the Province of Naples
Camorristi
Nuvoletta clan